Hebrew phonology may refer to:
Biblical Hebrew phonology
Modern Hebrew phonology
Tiberian Hebrew

fr:Prononciation de l'hébreu
ur:عبرانی صوتیات